Snell Acoustics was an American manufacturer of high-end loudspeakers which was founded by Peter Snell (1946-1984) in Massachusetts in 1976. It ceased manufacturing in May 2010.

References

External links
 Website of Snell Acoustics
 Snell Acoustics on hometheaterreview.com

Loudspeaker manufacturers
Electronics companies established in 1976
Electronics companies disestablished in 2010
American brands
1976 establishments in Massachusetts
2010 disestablishments in Massachusetts
Audio equipment manufacturers of the United States